Azizabad (also Romanized as ‘Azīzābād; also known as ‘Azīzābād-e ‘Omrānī and ‘Omrānī) is a village in Howmeh Rural District, in the Central District of Gonabad County, Razavi Khorasan Province, Iran. At the 2006 census, its population was 180, in 58 families.

See also 

 List of cities, towns and villages in Razavi Khorasan Province

References 

Populated places in Gonabad County